Atractus trilineatus, commonly known as the three-lined ground snake, is a species of small burrowing colubrid snake.

Geographic range
It is found in northern South America, and the Caribbean island of Trinidad.

Description
Dorsally, they are brown with three or four darker longitudinal stripes; ventrally they are either uniform white, or have a few brown dots. The smooth dorsal scales are in 15 rows, and the anal plate is entire. Ventrals are 125-150, and subcaudals only 11-19.

Diet
They are believed to feed on soft-bodied insects and earthworms, as well as fish and tadpoles.

References

Further reading
 Wagler [JG]. 1828. "Auszüge aus seinem [sic] Systema Amphibiorum". Isis von Oken 21: 740-744. (Atractus trilineatus, new species, p. 742 + Plate X, Figures 1-4).

Atractus
Snakes of South America
Snakes of the Caribbean
Reptiles of Brazil
Reptiles of Guyana
Reptiles of Trinidad and Tobago
Reptiles of Venezuela
Reptiles described in 1828
Taxa named by Johann Georg Wagler